Tret  is a village and union council of Murree Tehsil in the Murree District of Punjab, Pakistan. It is located in the south of the tehsil at 33°49′60″N 73°16′60″E and is bounded to the north by Khyber Pakhtunkhwa, to the north-east by Ghora Gali, to the east by Numbal and to the south by Angoori. During the British rule, Tret housed a few army installations and a Dak Bungalow

According to the 1998 census of Pakistan it had a population of 14,184.

Population
The majority of Tret population belongs to Shia sect.

References

Murree
Union councils of Murree Tehsil
Populated places in Murree Tehsil